Jordi Torras Badosa (born 24 September 1980), commonly known as Torras, is a Spanish futsal player.

Honours

Club
4 Spanish League (2007–08, 2010–11, 2011–12, 2012–13)
3 Supercopa de España (2007, 2009, 2013)
4 Copa de España (2009, 2011, 2012, 2013)
4 Copa del Rey (2011, 2012, 2013, 2014)
3 UEFA Futsal Cup (2009, 2012, 2014)
1 Intercontinental Cup (2008)
1 Recopa de Europa (2008)

National Team
1 FIFA Futsal World Cup (2004)
1 FIFA Futsal World Cup runner-up (2008)
4 UEFA Futsal Championship (2005, 2007, 2010, 2012)

Individual
1 Best Ala-cierre LNFS (08/09)

External links
LNFS.es
RFEF profile
UEFA profile

1980 births
Living people
Spanish men's futsal players
Inter FS players
FC Barcelona Futsal players
FS Cartagena players
FS Martorell players